is a Japanese manga artist. She is primarily known for her manga works which feature LGBT (especially lesbian and transgender) topics.

Career 
Her best known and selling series are Aoi Hana and Wandering Son. Aoi Hana was adapted as an anime television series broadcast in 2009. Wandering Son has been licensed in English by Fantagraphics Books and an anime adaptation aired in 2011. In 2014, she collaborated with the original character concepts for the anime Aldnoah.Zero. In 2016, she provided the character designs for the anime Battery.v

Aside from her publications as a professional manga artist, she is also active in amateur manga. In 2009, she formed a doujinshi circle named "Harapeko Sentai Hashi Ranger" together with fellow manga artists Hisae Iwaoka, Fumiko Tanagawa, Aoki Toshinao and Ishide Den.

Works
  (1997–2002, 7 volumes)
  (2003, one-shot)
  (2003, 1 volume)
  (1997, debut story)
 
 
 
 
 
 
 sweet16
  (2002–2004, 2 volumes)
  (2002–2005, 3 volumes)
  (2002–2013, 15 volumes)
  (2004–2013, 8 volumes)
  (1 volume)
  (2004–2005, 2 chapters)
  (adaptation of the Chiya Fujino novel, 2007–2008, 1 volume)
  (2009, one-shot)
  (2011–present, 3+ volumes)
  (2012–2017, 7 volumes)
  (2013, 1 volume)
  (2014–2015, 1 volume)
 Original character concepts for Aldnoah.Zero (2014)
  (2014–2019, 10 volumes)
  (2016–2020, 3 volumes)
Beautiful Everyday (ビューティフル・エブリデイ) (2018–present, 2+ volumes)
Even Though We're Adults (おとなになっても Otona ni nattemo) (2019–present, 6+ volumes)
Bloom Brothers (ブルーム・ブラザーズ) (2020–present, 1+ volume)

References

External links
 Takako Shimura's blog  
 Takako Shimura's tumblr
 

1973 births
Living people
Women manga artists
Manga artists from Kanagawa Prefecture
Japanese female comics artists
Female comics writers
Japanese women writers